Pete Wendling (June 6, 1888 – April 7, 1974) was an American composer and pianist, born in New York City to German immigrants.

He started his working life as a carpenter, but gained fame during the mid-1910s as a popular music composer, with his name appearing on the "Soup and Fish Rag" in 1913. He worked on such hits as "Yaaka Hula Hickey Dula" (recorded by Al Jolson), "Take Me To The Land Of Jazz", "Take Your Girlie To The Movies", "Felix The Cat", and "Oh What A Pal Is Mary".

Wendling was also one of the top pianists of his era, and set a long-standing record when he appeared at the London Hippodrome for eight consecutive weeks. He joined the Rhythmodik Music Roll Company in 1914, and started to record his performances on paper rolls for player pianos. In 1916 he recorded for American Piano Company (Ampico). In 1918, he joined the largest piano roll company, QRS, and rapidly became one of their most popular artists, his distinctive yet always fresh performances constantly topping their best-selling lists. They were still in production as of 2003.

He recorded two sides for Okeh Records in 1923, and in 1926, cut another four for Cameo. In 1927, QRS, who were tightening their belt due to declining sales, released Wendling, and he concentrated on his composing career until his retirement in the 1950s. In 1955, he co-wrote "I Wonder", which became a UK chart hit for both Jane Froman and Dickie Valentine. Wendling's last notable work was "Rich in Love" in 1956.

Married to Anna, he had no children. A resident of Manhattan, he died in New York City in April 1974, aged 85 after several strokes.

References

External links
 Pete Wendling recordings at the Discography of American Historical Recordings.

1888 births
1974 deaths
20th-century American composers